William Morgan Butler (January 29, 1861March 29, 1937) was a lawyer and legislator for the State of Massachusetts, and a United States Senator.

Biography
Butler was born in New Bedford, Massachusetts, where he attended the public school and studied law.  He was admitted to the State bar in 1883. After graduating from the law department of Boston University in 1884, he practiced law in New Bedford until 1895. He was a member of the Massachusetts House of Representatives from 1890 to 1891, and a member of the Massachusetts Senate from 1892 to 1895, serving as its President in 1894 and 1895.

Butler moved to Boston in 1895, and continued the practice of law until 1912, when he engaged in the manufacture of cotton goods. He was a member of the commission to revise the statutes of Massachusetts from 1896 to 1900, and was chairman of the Republican National Committee from 1924 to 1928.

On November 13, 1924, Butler was appointed as a Republican to the United States Senate to fill the vacancy caused by the death of Henry Cabot Lodge, and served from November 13, 1924, to December 6, 1926, when a successor was elected. His bid for election to fill the vacancy was unsuccessful.

Butler served as chairman of the Committee on Patents in the 69th Congress, and then resumed his manufacturing interests. He thereafter resided in Boston. In 1932, Butler sought to return to the Republican National Committee, but was defeated by John Richardson by a vote of 18 to 15. Butler died on March 29, 1937 and was interred in Forest Hills Cemetery.

See also
 115th Massachusetts General Court (1894)
 116th Massachusetts General Court (1895)

Sources

External links

1927 Time cover featuring Butler
 Political Graveyard

|-

|-

|-

|-

|-

1861 births
1937 deaths
19th-century American politicians
20th-century American politicians
Boston University School of Law alumni
Lawyers from Boston
Republican Party Massachusetts state senators
Republican Party members of the Massachusetts House of Representatives
Politicians from Boston
Politicians from New Bedford, Massachusetts
Presidents of the Massachusetts Senate
Republican National Committee chairs
Republican Party United States senators from Massachusetts